The 1909–10 Welsh Amateur Cup was the 20th season of the Welsh Amateur Cup. The cup was won by Johnstown Amateurs who defeated Bangor Reserves 2-1 in the final at Sealand Road, Chester.

First Preliminary Round

Second Preliminary Round

First round

Second round

Third round

Fourth round

Semi-final

Final

References

1909-10
Welsh Cup
1909–10 domestic association football cups